Mariner Hill is a prominent snow-free conical hill, rising to about  midway between Syrtis Hill and Two Step Cliffs, situated in the southeastern portion of Alexander Island, Antarctica. It was named by the UK Antarctic Place-Names Committee in 1993 after Mariner 9, the NASA probe which was the first spacecraft to orbit the planet Mars, in 1971.

References

Hills of Palmer Land
Landforms of Alexander Island